Jack Alan Brown (born 2 November 2001) is an Indonesian professional footballer who plays as a midfielder for Liga 1 club Persita Tangerang.

Club career

Persita Tangerang
He was signed for Persita Tangerang to play in Liga 1 in the 2021 season. Brown made his league debut in a 3–0 win against Persiraja Banda Aceh on 6 February 2022 as a substitute for Ricki Ariansyah in the 88th minute at the Kompyang Sujana Stadium, Denpasar.

International career
In August 2020, Brown was included on Indonesia national under-19 football team 30-man list for Training Center in Croatia. He earned his first under-19 cap on 25 September 2020 in a 0–1 loss against Bosnia and Herzegovina U19. On 11 October 2020, Brown scored a brace for the youth team in a 4–1 win against North Macedonia U19.

Personal life
Brown was born and raised in Jakarta to an English father and an Indonesian mother. He started his football education in Arsenal Soccer School Indonesia. His brother George is also a professional footballer.

Career statistics

Club

References

External links
 Jack Brown at Soccerway
 Jack Brown at Liga Indonesia

2001 births
Living people
Sportspeople from Jakarta
Indo people
English footballers
Indonesian footballers
Indonesia youth international footballers
British Asian footballers
Indonesian people of English descent
Liga 1 (Indonesia) players
Persita Tangerang players
Association football midfielders
Indonesian expatriate footballers